Kai Aslak Mykkänen (born 31 July 1979 in Espoo) is a Finnish politician and the former Minister of the Interior. He represents the National Coalition Party in the Uusimaa electoral district.

Early life
Mykkänen was born in Espoo to the journalist and politician Jouni Mykkänen and Maria Mykkänen (née Sokolow). He is of Russian descent through his mother, who is a daughter of Russian emigrants. His home language was mainly Finnish, but he also speaks fluent Russian. He has worked three years in Russia.

Political career
Mykkänen was the chairman of the Coalition Party Youth League 2000–2001. He was a member of the City Council of Espoo 2001–2008.

Mykkänen was elected to the Parliament of Finland in the 2015 election with 5,260 votes. He was a member of the Environment Committee and Grand Committee from 2015 until 2016. 

On 22 June 2016, Mykkänen was appointed as the Minister for Foreign Trade and Development in the cabinet of Prime Minister Juha Sipilä after Lenita Toivakka's resignation. On 6 February 2018, Mykkänen shifted his portfolio in order to replace Paula Risikko as the Minister of the Interior. In this capacity, he also co-chaired the Justice and Home Affairs Ministers Meeting of the European People's Party (EPP), alongside Esteban González Pons.

Other activities
 World Bank, Ex-Officio Alternate Member of the Board of Governors (2016-2018)

Political positions
As Minister of the Interior, Mykkänen proposed in 2018 to increase Europe's quota refugee system ten-fold, for the EU to receive 250,000 new asylum seekers per year instead of the current 25,000.  When the Oulu child sexual exploitation scandal broke out, Mykkänen said these things shouldn't be occurring in Finland and called for immigrants residing at reception centres to be educated.

Personal life
Mykkänen has two children with his wife Anna.

References

|-

1979 births
Living people
People from Espoo
Finnish people of Russian descent
National Coalition Party politicians
Government ministers of Finland
Ministers of the Interior of Finland
Members of the Parliament of Finland (2015–19)
Members of the Parliament of Finland (2019–23)